Systeloglossum is a genus of flowering plants from the orchid family, Orchidaceae. It contains 5 known species, all native to southeastern Central America and northwestern South America.

Systeloglossum acuminatum Ames & C.Schweinf. - Costa Rica, Panama
Systeloglossum bennettii (Garay) Dressler & N.H.Williams - Peru
Systeloglossum costaricense Schltr. - Peru
Systeloglossum ecuadorense (Garay) Dressler & N.H.Williams - Ecuador
Systeloglossum panamense Dressler & N.H.Williams - Panama

See also 
 List of Orchidaceae genera

References

External links 
 IOSPE orchid photos, Systeloglossum ecuadorense (Garay) Dressler & N.H. Williams 1970 Photo courtesy of © Lourens Grobler.

Oncidiinae genera
Oncidiinae